Dr. Saadallah Agha al-Qalaa (b. Damascus, 1950) is the former minister of tourism in Syria. He has a Ph.D. in civil engineering.
Dr. Saadallah Agha al-Qalaa is a man of science and art. Born in 1950, he studied music at the Conservatory of Aleppo, and later became a teacher there. At the same time, he studied Civil engineering at the University of Aleppo, and later traveled to France to prepare his Ph.D. in Engineering. Upon his return to Syria as a professor of engineering and computer programming at the University of Damascus, he began to write many studies and research in Arabic music, and presented hundreds of hours of music television programs, in Syrian television and most of the Arab television stations. Adept at playing qanun, he is also a member of the Syrian Associations of Engineers, Artists and Teachers, a co-founder of the Syrian Computer Society, and served as Minister of Tourism in Syria for a period of ten years. He won also numerous Syrian and Arab awards.

Saadallah Agha al-Qalaa is distinguished, musically, through his tendency to employ modern technology, especially computers and databases, in Arabic music research in ways never touched before.

He developed an Arabic music information system, and put it in the service of Arab music analysis, then he started to publish his research on television, applying the latest music and comparative analysis methods, relying on his specialty in music, engineering and informatics  at the same time, in addition to his high performance in TV presentation. His efforts are currently focused on completing his project, "the second book of Songs" and publishing it in the form of an electronic encyclopedia. In March 2017, he launched his new project: Towards a New Arab Music Revival.

References

External links
Chiefs of State and Cabinet Members of Foreign Governments: Syria
https://www.agha-alkalaa.net/

1950 births
People from Aleppo
Living people
Syrian ministers of tourism